The Church of Jesus Christ of Latter-day Saints in the Caucasus refers to the Church of Jesus Christ of Latter-day Saints (LDS Church) and its members in Armenia, Georgia, and Azerbaijan. When the Church was registered in Armenia in 1995, there were approximately 200 members in that country. In Georgia, converts were not allowed to be baptized until 2003. In 2021, there were 3,537 members in 5 congregations in Armenia, and 258 members in 2 congregations in Georgia. With no stake or district as of 2021 (Armenia's Districts were dissolved in 2020), all congregations in Georgia and Armenia are administered directly by the Church's Armenia/Georgia Mission.

History

Armenia

The first Armenians to join the church was Hagop T. Vartooguian and three members of his family in Constantinople Turkey. They were baptized January 4, 1885. Missionary work commenced among Armenians outside Armenia in the late nineteenth century particularly in Turkey. As the Ottoman Empire began to decline, violence against Armenians began to increase. In 1909, the Turkish mission closed.  The Armenian Latter-day Saints were driven from their homes. In 1921, church leaders encouraged Latter-day Saints in the United States and in Aintab to fast and pray for deliverance these Armenian Latter-day Saints. $115,000 were donated and used to move members south to Aleppo, Syria and some migrated to the United states. The branch formed in Aleppo had 59 members as of 1946. Members of this branch were forced to leave Syria between 1947 and 1950 because of threats against Armenians. In 1950, the Near East mission was closed.

On December 7, 1988, Elder Russell M. Nelson delivered a check for $100,000 to the Soviet Ambassador to provide relief for victims of the 1988 Armenian earthquake. The Church gained converts among American-Armenians by the late 1989. In 1989, the Church announced that it would begin long-term assistance in Armenia, rebuilding and distributing humanitarian aid following the severe earthquake. In June 1991, Elder Dallin H. Oaks dedicated Armenia for missionary work. The first Church-humanitarian missionary couples arrived in November 1991. The Yerevan branch was organized on January 20, 1994. In 1995, the Yerevan district was organized. Seminary and institute programs began in 1995. The Church was registered in Armenia on December 22, 1995. The translation of the Book of Mormon in Eastern Armenian was translated with selections published as early as 1991 and fully completed on December 28, 2000. In 2000, Armenia became part of the Europe East Area. On February 2, 2002 the Yerevan meetinghouse, Armenia's first, was dedicated. The first Church event broadcast via satellite into Armenia was the dedication of the Nauvoo Temple on June 30, 2002. Elder M. Russell Ballard visited the Armenian President Robert Kocharian in Yerevan in August 2006.

Georgia

Elder Jeffrey R. Holland blessed the land in March 1999. He was accompanied by Elder Charles A. Didier, president of the Europe East Area, and their wives. Later that Georgia was assigned to the Armenia Yerevan Mission shortly thereafter. Nonproselyting, Humanitarian missionaries, Phillip and Betty Reber, arrived in June of that year. They began donating relief supplies to orphanages and taught English.In September, the first Georgians to join the Church were baptized in Armenia due to the Church’s unregistered status.  

The first Primary was held Aug. 8, 1999; the first meeting in the Mitskevich Street building was held Sept. 15, 1999; the first priesthood and Relief Society meetings were held Feb. 22, 2000; and the first Young Women meeting was held March 5, 2000. In 2000, Georgia became part of the Europe East Area.  Georgia had 14 members by March 2000. On August 9 2002 a branch, Georgia's first, was organized in Tbilisi having 6 humanitarian service missionaries and 50 members. 

In August 2005, the Church registered with the government, allowing the first full-time proselytizing missionaries to be assigned with the first arriving March 31, 2006. In 2008, missionaries were withdrawn for a nearly three months period due to conflict with Russia. The seminary and institute programs were introduced in 2008 – the same year the first local member served a full-time mission. The Church translated General Conference talks into Georgian for the first time in October 2011. In 2012, a group was organized in Rustavi. In 2018, the Church reestablished a second branch in Tbilisi named the Temka Branch. The Temka Branch services northern areas of Tbilisi, whereas the Avlabari Branch services southern areas of Tbilisi. Both branches reported directly to the Armenia/Georgia Mission in 2019. In 2018 the translation of the Book of Mormon in Georgian was completed.

Azerbaijan
The Baku Branch that primarily served members from outside the country living or staying in the country existed in the early to mid 2010s, but later dissolved. In December 2011, the branch consisted of 37 members. Of the 37 members, most were Americans, a Brazilian, a Taiwanese, a Russian, and two Scots. A member group in Baku has operated following the discontinuation of the branch. Azerbaijan is in the Europe Central Area.

Humanitarian Efforts
The Church has provided extensive humanitarian and development work in Armenia and Georgia since 1985, with as many as 633 projects completed in Armenia and 388 projects completed in Georgia. Projects completed have included Benson Food initiatives, clean water projects, community projects, emergency response, immunizations, maternal and newborn care, refugee response, vision care, wheelchair donations, donated supplies to orphanages, and supplied medical equipment and furnishings to hospitals and other agencies. The Church donated 10,000 pounds of powdered milk in 1989. In addition to large amounts of food donated, the Huntsman family constructed a cement plant in the late 1980s and early 1990s that provided concrete to rebuild homes for the 500,000 homeless following the earthquake. Humanitarian missionaries participated in a private aid relief effort that feeds over 200,000 needy Armenians. In 2008, the Church conducted clean water projects and donated wheelchairs. In Azerbaijan, there have been at least nine community projects in Azerbaijan sponsored by the Church.

Congregations 

Congregations as of February 2023:

Yerevan Armenia District
Arabkir Branch
Artashat Branch
Vanadzor Branch
Yerevan Central Branch

Georgia Congregations
As of February 2023, Georgia had 2 congregations meeting in Tbilisi Georgia. A Family History Center is also located in Tbilisi.
Avlabari Branch
Temka Branch

The Armenia/Georgia Mission Branch serves individuals and families not in proximity to a meetinghouse. Congregations not part of a stake are called branches, regardless of size.

Azerbaijan Congregations
The Baku Branch existed in the early 2010s, but later dissolved. A member group in Baku has operated after the branch discontinued operations.

Missions
In November 1993, Armenia was assigned to the Bulgaria Sofia Mission. In July 1994, responsibility for Armenia shifted to the Russia Moscow Mission. The first two young missionaries, Dallas M. Woolf and Cade L. Rindfleisch, went to Yerevan from the mission in January 1995. Armenia was transferred to the Russia Rostov Mission in January 1997. Finally, the Armenia Yerevan Mission was organized on 1 July 1999, with Robert H. Sangster as president. In 2017, the mission was renamed the Armenia/Georgia Mission.

Challenges that limits LDS Church growth in Armenia include Moral and social challenges. Smoking, drinking and abortion were permissible under the Soviet Union and getting people to live church health standards is a struggle. Many see leaving the Apostolic Church as less Armenian, both individually and by social norms.

Azerbaijan is part of the Central Eurasian Mission which was organized July 1, 2015. No missionaries have ever been sent to the country. In April 2018, Bulgaria was added to the mission, it was renamed the Bulgarian Central Eurasian Mission, and the offices were moved to Sofia. As of August 2021, boundaries for this mission include Azerbaijan, Bulgaria, Tajikistan, Turkey, Turkmenistan, and Uzbekistan.

Temples
There are no temples in the Caucasus region. Armenia and Georgia are currently located within the Kyiv Ukraine Temple District.

See also

Religion in Armenia
Religion in Georgia

References

External links
 The Church of Jesus Christ of Latter-day Saints - Armenia - Official Site (Armenian)
 The Church of Jesus Christ of Latter-day Saints - Armenian Newsroom Site (Armenian)
 ComeUntoChrist.org Latter-day Saints Visitor site
 1921 Armenian Exodus

 Armenia
Christianity in Armenia
Christianity in Georgia (country)
Christianity in Azerbaijan